The United pastoral districts of Moreton, Wide Bay, Burnett and Maranoa and from 1857 Moreton, Wide Bay, Burnett, Maranoa, Leichhardt and Port Curtis, an electoral district of the Legislative Assembly in the Colony of New South Wales was created in 1856 and abolished in 1858.


Election results

1858

1857 by-election

1856

References

New South Wales state electoral results by district